Blame is the act of censuring someone.

Blame may also refer to:

Songs 

 "Blame" (Autumn Hill song), 2015
 "Blame" (Bastille song), 2016
 "Blame" (Calvin Harris song), 2014 song featuring John Newman
 "Blame" (Collective Soul song), 1997
 "Blame", a song by Bastille from Wild World
 "Blame", a song by Cavo from Bright Nights Dark Days, 2009
 "Blame", a song by KoRn from Untouchables
 "Blame", a song by Soul Coughing from El Oso

Film 

 Blame (2010 film), an Australian film
 Blame (2017 film), an American film
 Blame! (film), a 2017 anime film based on the similarly titled manga

Other

 Blame!, a Japanese manga 
 Blame (horse), a racehorse
 Blame (music producer), a British music producer and DJ
 Blame, a term in version control for finding the author of a revision

See also 

 
 
 WikiBlame, a software blame tool for articles.